Apamea niveivenosa, the snowy-veined apamea, is a moth of the family Noctuidae. The species was first described by Augustus Radcliffe Grote in 1879. It is native to northern North America, where it can be found across Canada and south to California.

The forewing length is 15 to 18 millimeters. Most moths are an ochre to orange-tan color, but a form in eastern British Columbia is dark gray with lighter gray lines and spots.

The larva is a subterranean cutworm that feeds on grasses. It is a pest of grain crops in interior North America.

Subspecies
 Apamea niveivenosa niveivenosa 
 Apamea niveivenosa obscuroides Poole, 1989

References

External links

Apamea (moth)
Agricultural pest insects
Moths of North America
Moths described in 1879
Taxa named by Augustus Radcliffe Grote